Raze may refer to:
 Demolition
Slighting
 Raze, Haute-Saône, a town in France
 Raze (house-music group)
 Raze (Christian pop group)
 Raze (Underworld), a fictional character in the Underworld films
 Raze (magazine), a videogame magazine published by Newsfield Publications from 1990-1991
 Raze (film), a 2013 exploitation film
 Raze (comics), a Marvel Comics character and Brotherhood of Mutants member